Mahnaz Bahmani (born 1970) is an Iranian politician.

Bahmani was born in Sarab. She is a member of the 9th Islamic Consultative Assembly from the constituency of Sarab. Bahmani won with 31,038 (46.49%) votes. Mahnaz Bahmani is one of nine women in the Iranian Parliament.

References

Deputies of Sarab
Members of the 9th Islamic Consultative Assembly
Islamic Azad University alumni
People from Sarab, East Azerbaijan
1970 births
Living people
21st-century Iranian women politicians
21st-century Iranian politicians